Hanna Anatoliïvna Kasyanova (née Melnychenko) (born 24 April 1983 in Tbilisi, Georgia) is a Ukrainian heptathlete.

Career
Kasyanova won the 2013 Décastar competition with 6308 points.

Personal life
Kasyanova was married to Italian decathlete William Frullani. Since 2014, she is married to Ukrainian decathlete Oleksiy Kasyanov.

Achievements

References

External links

1983 births
Living people
Ukrainian heptathletes
Sportspeople from Tbilisi
Athletes (track and field) at the 2008 Summer Olympics
Athletes (track and field) at the 2012 Summer Olympics
Athletes (track and field) at the 2016 Summer Olympics
Olympic athletes of Ukraine
World Athletics Championships athletes for Ukraine
World Athletics Championships winners
Universiade medalists in athletics (track and field)
Universiade bronze medalists for Ukraine
Medalists at the 2007 Summer Universiade
21st-century Ukrainian women